Bidita Bag is an Indian actress and model. She is mostly known for her inclination towards socio-political films.

Career 
While in college, Bidita pursued a career in modelling. She was spotted by Jeena Mitra Banik and ace make-up artist Late Prabeer Kumar Dey. She came into limelight in Kolkata after working for designers like Sabyasachi Mukherjee and Kiran Uttam Ghosh. After graduation she shifted her base to Mumbai. She has worked for Lakme Fashion Week, Lakme Elle-18, Vaseline, Nokia, Motorola, Colgate, Reliance etc. Recently she has been face of brands like Fair and Lovely (make-up man ki beti), 7UP, Samsung Corby TV, Wild Stone deodorant, Kwality Walls Cornetto, Manubhai Jewellers, Jade, Bombay Dyeing, Eye-tex Dazzler etc. Bidita made her foray into movies with a Bengali film called Icche, which released in July 2011.

Filmography

Films

Web series

References

External links 
 
 
 

Living people
Year of birth missing (living people)
People from Howrah
Actresses from Kolkata
Indian film actresses
Indian web series actresses
Bengali actresses
Actresses in Hindi cinema
Actresses in Bengali cinema
Actresses in Assamese cinema
Actresses in Odia cinema
Bengali female models
Female models from Kolkata
Kendriya Vidyalaya alumni
Jadavpur University alumni
20th-century Bengalis
21st-century Bengalis
21st-century Indian actresses